The Sudan national under-20 football team is the under-20 football team of Sudan. It is controlled by the Sudan Football Association.

Current squad
 The following players were called up for the 2022 CECAFA U-20 Championship.
 Match dates: 28 October – 11 November 2022Caps and goals correct as of:''' 5 November 2022, after the match against

References

African national under-20 association football teams
under-20